The 2012 United States Olympic trials for swimming events were held from June 25 to July 2 at the CenturyLink Center Omaha in Omaha, Nebraska.  It was the qualifying meet for American swimmers who hoped to compete at the 2012 Summer Olympics in London.

Qualification criteria

A total of 47 swimmers (not including open water swimmers) were chosen for the 2012 Summer Olympics.  To make the Olympic team, a swimmer must place in the top two in one of the thirteen individual events.  To be considered for the U.S. 4×100-meter and 4×200-meter freestyle relay teams, a swimmer must place in the top six in the 100-meter and 200-meter freestyle, respectively.  Swimmers must have achieved a time standard to be eligible to compete in the U.S. Olympic trials:

Information retrieved from USA Swimming.

Events
The meet featured twenty-six individual events all swum in a long course (50-meter) pool: thirteen events for men and thirteen events for women. Events 200 meters and shorter were held with preliminaries, semifinals and finals, while events 400 meters and longer were held with preliminaries and finals. The semifinals featured sixteen swimmers in two heats; the finals included eight swimmers in a single heat. Preliminaries were seeded with ten lanes. Event order, which mimicked that of the 2012 Olympics, with the exception of the Olympic relay events, was:

Note: prelims/semifinals/finals were swum in events 200 meters and shorter; prelims/finals in events 400 meters or longer. For prelims/semifinals/finals events, prelims and semis were on the same day, with finals the next evening. For the 400-meter events, prelims and finals were the same day. For the 800 and 1500 meter races, prelims are in the morning of one day, with finals in the evening of the next day.

U.S. Olympic Team
The following swimmers qualified to compete at the 2012 Summer Olympics (for pool events):

Men
Nathan Adrian, Clark Burckle, Tyler Clary, Conor Dwyer, Anthony Ervin, Jimmy Feigen, Andrew Gemmell, Matt Grevers, Brendan Hansen, Charlie Houchin, Connor Jaeger, Cullen Jones, Jason Lezak, Ryan Lochte, Tyler McGill, Matt McLean, Michael Phelps, Eric Shanteau, Davis Tarwater, Nick Thoman, Peter Vanderkaay, and Scott Weltz.

Women
Cammile Adams, Alyssa Anderson, Elizabeth Beisel, Rachel Bootsma, Natalie Coughlin, Claire Donahue, Missy Franklin, Jessica Hardy, Kathleen Hersey, Kara Lynn Joyce, Ariana Kukors, Breeja Larson, Micah Lawrence, Katie Ledecky, Caitlin Leverenz, Lia Neal, Lauren Perdue, Allison Schmitt, Rebecca Soni, Chloe Sutton, Dana Vollmer, Shannon Vreeland, Amanda Weir, and Kate Ziegler.

Results 
Key:

Men's events

Women's events

See also
United States at the 2012 Summer Olympics
United States Olympic Trials (swimming)
USA Swimming

References

External links
Official website of the 2012 U.S. Olympic Trials (swimming)
  2012 US Olympic swimming trials results by event at Omegatiming.com
Psych sheet (PDF, as of June 21, 2012)
Official event information (PDF, as of February 24, 2012)

United States
United States Olympic trials
United States Summer Olympics Trials
Sports competitions in Omaha, Nebraska
Swimming Olympic trials